Bose Kaffo (born 14 November 1972 in Surulere, Lagos State, Nigeria) is a Nigerian professional table tennis player who competed at five Olympics from 1992 to 2008.

She is the second Nigerian woman to compete at five Olympics, after sprinter Mary Onyali. This feat was also achieved in 2008 by fellow table tennis player Segun Toriola. By the end of the 2008 Summer Olympics, only thirteen table tennis players worldwide had appeared at least five Olympics. Her doubles partners at the Olympics were Abiola Odumosu in 1992 and Olufunke Oshonaike from 1996 to 2004.

She has won fifteen medals (seven gold) in singles and doubles at six consecutive All-Africa Games from 1987 to 2007, winning at least one medal at each Games. In Singles, she won gold in 1995, silver in 1999 and 2007, and bronze in 2003. In Doubles, she won gold (with Olufunke Oshonaike) in 1995, 1999, and 2003, silver in 1991, and bronze in 2007. In Mixed Doubles, she won gold in 1991 (with Atanda Musa), 1995 (with Sule Olayele), and 1999 (with Segun Toriola) along with silver in 1987 and 2003 and bronze in 2007. Nigeria has won team gold at all All-Africa Games.

See also
List of athletes with the most appearances at Olympic Games

References

External links
 
 
 

1974 births
Living people
Nigerian female table tennis players
Olympic table tennis players of Nigeria
Table tennis players at the 1992 Summer Olympics
Table tennis players at the 1996 Summer Olympics
Table tennis players at the 2000 Summer Olympics
Table tennis players at the 2004 Summer Olympics
Table tennis players at the 2008 Summer Olympics
African Games gold medalists for Nigeria
African Games medalists in table tennis
Competitors at the 1995 All-Africa Games
Competitors at the 1999 All-Africa Games
Competitors at the 2003 All-Africa Games
Competitors at the 2007 All-Africa Games